Corsair Gaming, Inc. is an American computer peripherals and hardware company headquartered in Milpitas, California. Previously Corsair Components and Corsair Memory, it was incorporated in California in January 1994 as Corsair Microsystems and reincorporated in Delaware in 2007. It designs and sells a range of computer products, including high-speed DRAM modules, ATX power supplies (PSUs), USB flash drives (UFDs), CPU/GPU and case cooling, gaming peripherals (such as keyboards and computer mice), computer cases, solid-state drives (SSDs), and speakers.

It leases a production facility in Taoyuan City, Taiwan for assembly, testing and packaging of select products, with distribution centers in North America, Europe, and Asia and sales and marketing offices in major markets worldwide. It trades under the ticker symbol CRSR on the NASDAQ stock exchange. Lockdown orders associated with the COVID-19 pandemic, and a rise in demand for computing equipment, including the computer gaming sector, led to a significant short-term increase in Corsair's revenue.

History
The company was founded as Corsair Microsystems Inc. in 1994 by Andy Paul, Don Lieberman, and John Beekley. Corsair originally developed level 2 cache modules, called cache on a stick (COASt) modules, for OEMs. After Intel incorporated the L2 cache in the processor with the release of its Pentium Pro processor family, Corsair changed its focus to DRAM modules, primarily in the server market. This effort was led by Richard Hashim, one of the early employees at Corsair. In 2002, Corsair began shipping DRAM modules that were designed to appeal to computer enthusiasts, who were using them for overclocking. Since then, Corsair has continued to produce memory modules for PCs, and has added other PC components as well.

Corsair expanded its DRAM memory module production into the high end market for overclocking. This expansion allows for high power platforms and the ability to get more performance out of the CPU and RAM. The Corsair Vengeance Pro series and Corsair Dominator Platinum series are built for overclocking applications.

Corsair has since expanded their product line to include many types of high-end gaming peripherals, high performance air and water cooling solutions, and other enthusiast-grade components. Around 2009, Corsair contacted CoolIT Systems to integrate their liquid cooling technology into Corsair's offerings which resulted in a long term partnership.

In May 2021, Corsair announced that it will relocate its headquarters from Fremont to Milpitas, with the new lease stated to take effect in March 2022.

Transactions

On July 26, 2017, EagleTree Capital entered into an agreement to acquire a majority stake in Corsair from Francisco Partners and several other minority shareholders in a deal valued at $525 million. Corsair Founder and CEO Andy Paul retains his equity stake and remains in his role as CEO.

On June 27, 2018, Corsair announced that it will be acquiring Elgato Gaming from the Munich-based company Elgato, excluding their Eve division which was spun off as Eve Systems.

On July 24, 2019 it was announced that Corsair Components, Inc. acquired ORIGIN PC Corp.

On December 16, 2019, Corsair announced its intention to acquire SCUF Gaming.

On August 21, 2020, Corsair filed registration documents with the U.S. Securities and Exchange Commission for a planned $100 million IPO.

Products

The company's products include:

DRAM and DIMM memory modules for desktop and laptop PCs
USB flash drives
ATX and SFX PSUs
Computer cases
Pre-built high end gaming PCs
Liquid CPU and GPU cooling solutions
Computer fans
Solid-state drives
Audio headsets for gaming
Headset stands
Gaming Monitors
Webcams and streaming cameras
Gaming Keyboards
Computer mice
Mousepads
Gaming Chairs
Microphones
Capture Cards
PC Components

Since the custom computer industry has experienced an increased interest in products with RGB lighting, Corsair has added this feature to almost all of their product lines. In the gaming industry, Corsair has its biggest share of the market in memory modules (around 44%) and gaming keyboards (around 14%)).

See also
List of computer hardware manufacturers

References

External links
 

Companies based in Milpitas, California
Computer companies established in 1994
Computer memory companies
Computer peripheral companies
Computer power supply unit manufacturers
Companies listed on the Nasdaq
Impact of the COVID-19 pandemic on the video game industry
Technology companies based in the San Francisco Bay Area
1994 establishments in California
Computer enclosure companies
Computer hardware cooling
2020 initial public offerings
Video game hardware